The Northrop YC-125 Raider was a 1940s American three-engined STOL utility transport built by Northrop Corporation, Hawthorne, California.

Design and development
Northrop's first postwar civil design was a three-engined STOL passenger and cargo transport named the Northrop N-23 Pioneer, which was intended to replace the Ford Trimotors of the Central American airline Transportes Aéreos Centro Americanos (TACA). The Pioneer could carry 36 passengers or cargo, with a cargo door and a "chin" hatch allowing the loading of  lengths of pipes or timber into the aircraft's cabin. It first flew on 21 December 1946. The aircraft had good performance, resulting in an order of 40 aircraft from TACA, but political manoeuvring from Pan-Am after the shipping company Waterman Steamship Corporation purchased a major stake in TACA led to TACA losing rights to operate to or from the United States, which in turn caused TACA to cancel its order for the Pioneer. Despite extensive sales tours, no further orders were obtained. The Pioneer was lost in a fatal crash on 19 February 1948 when it lost a new tailfin design in flight. 

In 1948, the United States Air Force expressed interest in an aircraft of the same configuration and placed an order with Northrop for 23 aircraft, 13 troop transports designated the C-125A Raider and 10 for Arctic rescue work designated the C-125B. With the company designation N-32 Raider the first aircraft flew on 1 August 1949.

The aircraft was powered by three  Wright R-1820-99 Cyclone radial engines. The 13 troop transporters were designated YC-125A in-service and the Arctic rescue version the YC-125B.

The Canadian company Canadair considered building the N-23 under licence but did not proceed.

Operational history
Deliveries of the YC-125 to the USAF began in 1950. These aircraft did not serve long as they were underpowered and they were soon sent to Sheppard Air Force Base, Texas and relegated to be ground instructional trainers until retired in 1955 and declared surplus.

Most of the surplus aircraft were purchased by Frank Ambrose and sold to bush operators in South and Central America.

Variants

N-23 Pioneer
Prototype three-engined STOL transport, one built.
N-32 Raider
Company designation of military version of the N-23.
YC-125A Raider
N-32 with seats for thirty troops, 13 built.
YC-125B Raider
Arctic rescue version of the N-32 with twenty stretchers and provision for a ski undercarriage. Ten built (serials 48-618/627).
CL-3
Proposed Canadair licensed produced variant from 1949, with 3 x Canadian Pratt & Whitney R-1820 engines. Was redesignated CL-12 in the same year. Project was dropped sometime around early 1950.
N-74
Another proposed Canadair variant.  Improvements including the replacement of the three engines with two Allison T56 turboprops were studied.  Project abandoned in the early 1950s.

Operators
: United States Air Force

Surviving aircraft

 48-626 – YC-125B in storage at the National Museum of the United States Air Force in Dayton, Ohio.
 48-636 – YC-125A on static display at the Pima Air and Space Museum in Tucson, Arizona.

Specifications (YC-125B)

See also

References

Notes

Bibliography
Andrade, John M. U.S Military Aircraft Designations and Serials since 1909. Leicestershire, UK: Midland Counties Publications, 1979. .
 
The Illustrated Encyclopedia of Aircraft (Part Work 1982–1985). London: Orbis Publishing, 1986.

External links
 'Pioneer' for Frontier Flying – Popular Science

Northrop C-125 Raider
C-125
Northrop C-125
High-wing aircraft
Cruciform tail aircraft
Aircraft first flown in 1949
STOL aircraft